Zachrysia is a genus of air-breathing land snails, terrestrial pulmonate gastropod mollusks in the family Zachrysiidae

Species 
Species within the genus Zachrysia are majorly Cuban endemics and include:
 Zachrysia auricoma (Férussac, 1821)
Zachrysia baracoensis (Gutiérrez in Pfeiffer, 1858)
Zachrysia bayamensis (L. Pfeiffer, 1854)
Zachrysia emarginata  (Gundlach in Pfeiffer,. 1859)
Zachrysia flavicoma Pilsbry, 1929
 † Zachrysia fraterna Ross, 1988 
Zachrysia gibarana Pilsbry, 1929
Zachrysia guanensis (Poey, 1857)
Zachrysia guantanamensis (Poey, 1857)
Zachrysia gundlachiana Pilsbry, 1929
Zachrysia petitiana (d'Orbigny, 1842)
Zachrysia proboscidea (L. Pfeiffer, 1856)
 Zachrysia provisoria (Pfeiffer, 1858)
Zachrysia rangeliana (Pfeiffer, 1854)
Zachrysia scabrosa (Poey, 1854)
Zachrysia torrei (Henderson, 1916)
 Zachrysia trinitaria (L. Pfeiffer, 1858)

References

Further reading 
 Pilsbry H. A. (1928). "Studies on West Indian Mollusks: The Genus Zachrysia". Proceedings of the Academy of Natural Sciences of Philadelphia 80(1928): 581-606. JSTOR.

Camaenidae
Gastropod genera
Taxa named by Henry Augustus Pilsbry